Ignazio Batolo, commonly known as Pietro Bachi, (1787, in Palermo – 22 August 1853, in Boston) was a Sicilian American academic and professor. He was the first professor from Italy teaching at Harvard University.

In 1815 he was involved in an attempt aimed at promoting the claim of Joachim Murat to the throne of the Two Sicilies.  As a result of this attempt against the House of Bourbon he was forced to change his name with the alias of Pietro Bachi and escape to England and then to the United States.

In 1826 he became professor of Italian, Spanish and Portuguese language at Harvard University and kept this assignment until 1846. He died in Boston in 1853.

External links 
 Portrait of Pietro Bachi, Harvard Art Museums.
 Pietro Bachi, A Grammar of the Italian Language.
 Pietro Bachi, A Comparative View of the Spanish and Portuguese Languages.

Harvard University faculty
Kingdom of the Two Sicilies emigrants to the United States
American people of Italian descent
Writers from Palermo
1787 births
1853 deaths